Xaveri South Africa is a Catholic youth organization in South Africa. Xaveri South Africa is part of the African Xaveri Movement and a member of the Catholic umbrella of youth organizations Fimcap.

Activities 
The main activities of Xaveri South Africa are:
 Youth in Local Dialogue
 Education for Intercultural Citizenship
 Media and Arts for Social Change
 Refugee and Migrants project
 Youth Voluntary Service
 Networking, exchanges and civic engagement

Patron 
The patron of Xaveri South Africa (as well as from the Xaveri movement) is Saint Francis Xavier. The name of the movement originates from the name of its patron. Saint Francis Xavier is also the patron of African missions.

References

Catholic youth organizations
Youth organisations based in South Africa
Fimcap
Catholic Church in South Africa